Rasulpur Union is a union of Ghatail Upazila, Tangail District, Bangladesh. It is situated 12 km east of Ghatail and 52 km northeast of Tangail in the middle of Madhupur tract.

Demographics

According to the 2011 Bangladesh census performed by the Bangladesh Bureau of Statistics, the total population of Rasulpur union is 57,028. There are  14,654 households in total.

Education

The literacy rate of Rasulpur Union is 39.6% (Male-41.6%, Female-37.7%).

See also
 Union Councils of Tangail District

References

Populated places in Dhaka Division
Populated places in Tangail District
Unions of Ghatail Upazila